This is a list of Bengali language films released in India in the year 2014.

January–March

April–June

July–September

October–December

References 

2014 in Indian cinema
2014
Bengali
 
The Nagorik 
https://www.imdb.com/title/tt8037306/?ref_=ttfc_fc_tt